Mathiowetz is a surname. Notable people with the surname include:
Bernard F. Mathiowetz (1902–1997), American politician
Nancy Mathiowetz, American sociologist and statistician